Jānis Baumanis is a Latvian racing driver currently participating in the World Rallycross Championship since 2016 and representing STARD team.

Racing record

Complete FIA European Rallycross Championship results
(key)

Super1600

Supercar

Complete FIA World Rallycross Championship results

(key)

Supercar

References

External links

Living people
Latvian racing drivers
European Rallycross Championship drivers
World Rallycross Championship drivers
1992 births